Epaminondas Pantelakis (born 10 February 1995) is a Greek professional footballer who plays as a centre-back for Super League club PAS Giannina.

Career
Pantelakis was born on February 10, 1995, in Chania. He started his career in Ergotelis and with his jersey debuted in the Super League at the age of 19. In January 2015 he loaned to Fostiras, while in the summer of 2015 Olympiacos signed him and immediately loaned him to Kissamikos, where he remained until the end of his contract in June 2018. On 10 August 2018, he signed a three years' contract with Panathinaikos for an undisclosed fee. On August 31, 2019 PAS Giannina signed him.

Career statistics

Honours
PAS Giannina
 Super League Greece 2: 2019–20

References

External links
 

1996 births
Living people
Greek footballers
Greece youth international footballers
Super League Greece players
Football League (Greece) players
Super League Greece 2 players
Ergotelis F.C. players
PGS Kissamikos players
AO Chania F.C. players
Olympiacos F.C. players
Fostiras F.C. players
Panathinaikos F.C. players
Association football fullbacks
PAS Giannina F.C. players
Footballers from Chania